The Master Mind (also known as Sinners Three) is a lost 1920 American silent crime drama film produced by Whitman Bennett and released by Associated First National Pictures, later just First National Pictures). Kenneth Webb directed and Lionel Barrymore stars. It is based on a 1913 play, The Master Mind, by playwright Daniel David Cohen also known as Daniel D. Carter.

Plot
As described in a film magazine, in revenge for the successful prosecution of his younger brother Richard (Helton), accused of murder but innocent, by district attorney Wainwright (Kellard), Henry Allen (Barrymore), whose two passions are the study of psychology and his love for his brother, schemes to return the hurt to the lawyer and take away that which he holds dear. Finding that Wainwright loves a portrait of a young woman with a criminal record, Henry develops a scheme that takes Maggie (O'Brien) from prison and educates her abroad. Upon completion of her education he surrounds her with a pretending family, presumably to cover up her past, and brings her and the lawyer together and permits them to marry. With Wainwright running for governor, Henry goes to him and reveals the past of the Maggie and the criminal record of her family, intending to force Wainwright on threat of public exposure to withdraw from the election. Before this threat can be made effective, Maggie appeals to Henry, and he has a change of heart, realizing that vengeance is not man meted but God-visited. Henry leaves the loving couple to fame and happiness.

Cast
Lionel Barrymore as Henry Allen
Gypsy O'Brien as Maggie
Ralph Kellard as Wainwright
Bradley Barker as Creegan
Charles Brandt as Hank
Marie Shotwell as Sadie
Bernard Randall as Diamond Willie
Charles Edwards as The Butler
Louis Stern
Alma Aiken
Percy Helton as Younger brother Richard

See also
Lionel Barrymore filmography

References

External links

1920 films
American silent feature films
Films directed by Kenneth Webb
American films based on plays
Lost American films
Lost crime drama films
American black-and-white films
American crime drama films
1920 crime drama films
1920 lost films
1920s American films
Silent American drama films